Bufoniceps laungwalaensis , also known as the Laungwala long-headed lizard or Rajasthan toad-headed lizard, is an agamid lizard found in India (Rajasthan Desert, Jaisalmer District). The type locality is recorded as Laungwala, Jaisalmer District, Rajasthan, India. It is the only species in the genus Bufoniceps.

Gallery

References

 Arnold, E.N. 1992 The Rajasthan Toad-headed lizard, Phrynocephalus laungwalaensis (Reptilia: Agamidae), represents a new genus. J. Herpet., 26 (4): 467-472
 Barts, M. & Wilms, T. 2003 Die Agamen der Welt. Draco 4 (14): 4-23
 Sharma, R C 1978 A new species of Phrynocephalus Kaup (Reptilia: Agamidae) from the Rajasthan Desert, India, with notes on ecology. BULLETIN OF THE ZOOLOGICAL SURVEY OF INDIA 1(3) 1978: 291-294

External links
 Bufoniceps laungwalaensis

Agamidae
Fauna of the Thar Desert
Taxa named by Ramesh Chandra Sharma
Reptiles described in 1837